The red-capped lark (Calandrella cinerea) is a small passerine bird. This lark breeds in the highlands of eastern Africa southwards from Ethiopia and  Somaliland. In the south, its range stretches across the continent to Angola and south to the Cape in South Africa.

Taxonomy and systematics
The red-capped lark was originally placed in the genus Alauda. Alternate names for the red-capped lark include rufous short-toed lark and short-toed lark, although the former may also describe the Somali short-toed lark and the latter is also used as an alternate name for three other species in the genus Calandrella. Formerly, some authorities considered both the Mongolian short-toed lark (as C. c. dukhunensis) and Erlanger's lark (as C. c. erlangeri or C. c. ruficeps) to be subspecies of the red-capped lark . Additionally, some authorities considered the red-capped lark itself to be either conspecific with or as a subspecies of the greater short-toed lark.

Subspecies 
As of November 2020, five subspecies are recognized: 
 C. c. saturatior - (Reichenow, 1904): Found from Uganda and western Kenya south to Angola, north-eastern Namibia, northern Botswana and Zambia
 C. c. williamsi - (Clancey, 1952): Found in central Kenya 
 C. c. spleniata - (Strickland, 1853): Originally described as a separate species in the genus Alauda. Found from west-central Angola to west-central Namibia
 C. c. cinerea - (Gmelin, 1789): Found in southern and central Namibia, southern Botswana, Zimbabwe and South Africa
C. c. rufipecta - (Stervander et al, 2020): Found around the Jos Plateau in Nigeria.

Description
The red-capped lark is a 14- to 15-cm-long bird, with a typically upright stance. The colour of the streaked grey to brown upperparts is variable, with subspecies differing in hue and brightness, but this species is easily identified by its rufous cap, white underparts, and red shoulders. The short head crest is normally not noticeable except when it is raised during courtship displays.

The male has redder plumage and a longer crest than the female. Juveniles lack the red cap and shoulders of the adults, have dark spotting on the breast, and white spots on the dark brown upperparts.

The call of the red-capped lark is a tshwerp like a sparrow, and the song, given in the display flight, is a jumble of melodious phrases treee, treee, tip-tip, tippy, tippy tippy . It also imitates other birds.

Distribution and habitat
This is a species of short grassland including fallow agricultural areas. In eastern Africa, it is found in the highlands, normally above 1000 m, but it occurs down to sea level in suitable habitat in the cooler south of its extensive range.

Behaviour and ecology
The red-capped lark breeds all year round, but mainly from September to December. The nest is a deep, open cup which is set into the ground and usually situated close to a grass tuft, stone or mound. The nest is lined with fine grass and rootlets.

The red-capped lark forages on bare ground or in very short grass, moving with short runs to feed on seeds and insects. It is sometimes found in flocks which can number hundreds of birds.

References

Sinclair, Hockey and Tarboton, SASOL Birds of Southern Africa,

External links

 Kenya Birds
 SASOL e-guide
 Species text - The Atlas of Southern African Birds

red-capped lark
Birds of Sub-Saharan Africa
Birds of Southern Africa
red-capped lark
red-capped lark